The Irish Council for Civil Liberties is an Irish non-profit organisation dedicated to supporting the civil liberties and human rights of people in Ireland.

History
Founded in 1976 by future President Mary Robinson, Kader Asmal and others. Their primary role is in campaigning for civil rights as well as networking with other civil rights groups both nationally and internationally. During the divorce campaign of the 1980s and 1990s, the ICCL campaigned to support the legalisation of divorce which had previously been prohibited in the Constitution. In 1995 this was successfully passed.

The ICCL are a member organisation of the International Federation of Human Rights (FIDH).

The ICCL has repeatedly sought the abolition of the Special Criminal Court, and in 2009 opposed its expansion from a narrow focus on state security-related trials to also include organised crime.

In October 2011, the ICCL said the information provided to voters in advance of polling in two constitutional referendums on the Twenty-ninth Amendment and Thirtieth Amendment was "tardy and inadequate". and advocated a 'no' vote on the proposed Thirtieth Amendment. The Thirtieth Amendment was subsequently rejected by 116,000 votes.

In January 2020, the ICCL criticised management at CBS Kilkenny for attempting to implement facial recognition technology to record and process the biometric data of children and staff in the school. The implementation was postponed as a result.

In May 2020 ICCL suggested that Gardaí using spit hood during the COVID-19 pandemic might be "inhumane and degrading".

In recent years, the ICCL has prioritized police and justice reform as one of its main causes.

See also
 Amnesty International
 LGBT rights in the Republic of Ireland

References

External links
 Official website

 
Civil liberties advocacy groups
Human rights in Ireland
Council for Civil Liberties